Liu Huiting (born 21 November 1990) is a Chinese footballer who plays as a midfielder for Chinese Women's Super League club Changchun Zhuoyue WFC. She has been a member of the China women's national team.

References

1990 births
Living people
Chinese women's footballers
Women's association football midfielders
Changchun Zhuoyue players
Chinese Women's Super League players
China women's international footballers